A podcast is a program made available in digital format for download over the Internet. For example, an episodic series of digital audio files that a user can download to a personal device to listen to at a time of their choosing. Podcasts are primarily an audio medium, with some programs offering a supplemental video component. Streaming applications and podcasting services provide a convenient and integrated way to manage a personal consumption queue across many podcast sources and playback devices. There are also podcast search engines, which help users find and share podcast episodes.

A podcast series usually features one or more recurring hosts engaged in a discussion about a particular topic or current event. Discussion and content within a podcast can range from carefully scripted to completely improvised. Podcasts combine elaborate and artistic sound production with thematic concerns ranging from scientific research to slice-of-life journalism. Many podcast series provide an associated website with links and show notes, guest biographies, transcripts, additional resources, commentary, and occasionally a community forum dedicated to discussing the show's content.

The cost to the consumer is low, with many podcasts free to download. Some podcasts are underwritten by corporations or sponsored, with the inclusion of commercial advertisements. In other cases, a podcast could be a business venture supported by some combination of a paid subscription model, advertising or product delivered after sale. Because podcast content is often free, podcasting is often classified as a disruptive medium, adverse to the maintenance of traditional revenue models.

Podcasting is the preparation and distribution of audio files using RSS feeds to the devices of subscribed users. A podcaster normally buys this service from a podcast hosting company like SoundCloud or Libsyn. Hosting companies then distribute these audio files to streaming services, such as Apple and Spotify, which users can listen to on their smartphones or digital music and multimedia players, like an iPhone.

, there are at least 2,999,008 podcasts and 152,596,784 episodes.

Etymology 
"Podcast" is a portmanteau of "iPod" and "broadcast". The earliest use of "podcasting" was traced to The Guardian columnist and BBC journalist Ben Hammersley, who coined it in early February 2004 while writing an article for The Guardian newspaper. The term was first used in the audioblogging community in September 2004, when Danny Gregoire introduced it in a message to the iPodder-dev mailing list, from where it was adopted by podcaster Adam Curry. Despite the etymology, the content can be accessed using any computer or similar device that can play media files. The term "podcast" predates Apple's addition of podcasting features to the iPod and the iTunes software. Some sources have suggested the backronym "portable on demand" or "play on demand" for POD to avoid the loose reference to the iPod. This usage has been criticized as a retcon by tech blogger John Gruber.

History

In September 2000, early MP3 player manufacturer i2Go offered a service called MyAudio2Go.com that allowed users to download news stories for listening on a PC or MP3 player. The service was available for about a year until i2Go's demise in 2001.

In October 2000, the concept of attaching sound and video files in RSS feeds was proposed in a draft by Tristan Louis. The idea was implemented by Dave Winer, a software developer and an author of the RSS format.

Podcasting, once an obscure method of spreading audio information, has become a recognized medium for distributing audio content, whether for corporate or personal use. Podcasts are similar to radio programs in form, but they exist as audio files that can be played at a listener's convenience, anytime and anywhere.

The first application to make this process feasible was iPodderX, developed by August Trometer and Ray Slakinski. By 2007, audio podcasts were doing what was historically accomplished via radio broadcasts, which had been the source of radio talk shows and news programs since the 1930s. This shift occurred as a result of the evolution of internet capabilities along with increased consumer access to cheaper hardware and software for audio recording and editing.

In August 2004, Adam Curry launched his show Daily Source Code. It was a show focused on chronicling his everyday life, delivering news, and discussions about the development of podcasting, as well as promoting new and emerging podcasts. Curry published it in an attempt to gain traction in the development of what would come to be known as podcasting and as a means of testing the software outside of a lab setting. The name Daily Source Code was chosen in the hope that it would attract an audience with an interest in technology. Daily Source Code started at a grassroots level of production and was initially directed at podcast developers. As its audience became interested in the format, these developers were inspired to create and produce their own projects and, as a result, they improved the code used to create podcasts. As more people learned how easy it was to produce podcasts, a community of pioneer podcasters quickly appeared.

In November 2004, Libsyn launched the first podcast hosting company.

In June 2005, Apple released iTunes 4.9, which added formal support for podcasts, thus negating the need to use a separate program in order to download and transfer them to a mobile device. Although this made access to podcasts more convenient and widespread, it also effectively ended advancement of podcatchers by independent developers. Additionally, Apple issued cease and desist orders to many podcast application developers and service providers for using the term "iPod" or "Pod" in their products' names.

Within a year, many podcasts from public radio networks like the BBC, CBC Radio One, NPR, and Public Radio International placed many of their radio shows on the iTunes platform. In addition, major local radio stations like WNYC in New York City, WHYY-FM radio in Philadelphia, and KCRW in Los Angeles placed their programs on their websites and later on the iTunes platform. Concurrently, CNET, This Week in Tech, and later Bloomberg Radio, the Financial Times, and other for-profit companies provided podcast content, some using podcasting as their only distribution system.

As of early 2019, the podcasting industry still generated little overall revenue, although the number of persons who listen to podcasts continues to grow steadily. Edison Research, which issues the Podcast Consumer quarterly tracking report, estimates that in 2019, 90 million persons in the U.S. had listened to a podcast in the last month. As of 2020, 58% of the population of South Korea and 40% of the Spanish population had listened to a podcast in the last month. 12.5% of the UK population had listened to a podcast in the last week and 22% of the United States population listens to at least one podcast weekly. The form is also acclaimed for its low overhead for a creator to start and maintain their show, merely requiring a good-quality microphone, a computer or mobile device and associated software to edit and upload the final product, and some form of acoustic quieting. Podcast creators tend to have a good listener base because of their relationships with the listeners.

IP issues in trademark and patent law

Trademark applications
Between February March 10 and 25, 2005, Shae Spencer Management, LLC of Fairport, New York filed a trademark application to register the term "podcast" for an "online prerecorded radio program over the internet". On September 9, 2005, the United States Patent and Trademark Office (USPTO) rejected the application, citing Wikipedia's podcast entry as describing the history of the term. The company amended their application in March 2006, but the USPTO rejected the amended application as not sufficiently differentiated from the original. In November 2006, the application was marked as abandoned.

Apple trademark protections
On September 26, 2004, it was reported that Apple Inc. had started to crack down on businesses using the string "POD", in product and company names. Apple sent a cease and desist letter that week to Podcast Ready, Inc., which markets an application known as "myPodder". Lawyers for Apple contended that the term "pod" has been used by the public to refer to Apple's music player so extensively that it falls under Apple's trademark cover. Such activity was speculated to be part of a bigger campaign for Apple to expand the scope of its existing iPod trademark, which included trademarking "IPOD", "IPODCAST", and "POD". On November 16, 2006, the Apple Trademark Department stated that "Apple does not object to third-party usage of the generic term 'podcast' to accurately refer to podcasting services" and that "Apple does not license the term". However, no statement was made as to whether or not Apple believed they held rights to it.

Personal Audio lawsuits
Personal Audio, a company referred to as a "patent troll" by the Electronic Frontier Foundation (EFF), filed a patent on podcasting in 2009 for a claimed invention in 1996. In February 2013, Personal Audio started suing high-profile podcasters for royalties, including The Adam Carolla Show and the HowStuffWorks podcast. In October 2013, the EFF filed a petition with the US Trademark Office to invalidate the Personal Audio patent. On August 18, 2014, the EFF announced that Adam Carolla had settled with Personal Audio. Finally, on April 10, 2015, the U.S. Patent and Trademark Office invalidated five provisions of Personal Audio's podcasting patent.

Production and listening

A podcast generator maintains a central list of the files on a server as a web feed that one can access through the Internet. The listener or viewer uses special client application software on a computer or media player, known as a podcast client, which accesses this web feed, checks it for updates, and downloads any new files in the series. This process can be automated to download new files automatically, so it may seem to listeners as though podcasters broadcast or "push" new episodes to them. Podcast files can be stored locally on the user's device, or streamed directly. There are several different mobile applications that allow people to follow and listen to podcasts. Many of these applications allow users to download podcasts or stream them on demand. Most podcast players or applications allow listeners to skip around the podcast and to control the playback speed.

Podcasting has been considered a converged medium (a medium that brings together audio, the web and portable media players), as well as a disruptive technology that has caused some individuals in radio broadcasting to reconsider established practices and preconceptions about audiences, consumption, production and distribution.

Podcasts can be produced at little to no cost and are usually disseminated free-of-charge, which sets this medium apart from the traditional 20th-century model of "gate-kept" media and their production tools. Podcasters can, however, still monetize their podcasts by allowing companies to purchase ad time. They can also garner support from listeners through crowdfunding websites like Patreon, which provide special extras and content to listeners for a fee.

Types of podcasts
Podcasts vary in style, format, and topical content. Podcasts are partially patterned on previous media genres but depart from them systematically in certain computationally observable stylistic respects. The conventions and constraints which govern that variation are emerging and vary over time and markets; podcast listeners have various preferences of styles but conventions to address them and communicate about them are still unformed. Some current examples of types of podcasts are given below. This list is likely to change as new types of content, new technology to consume podcasts, and new use cases emerge.

Enhanced podcasts
An enhanced podcast, also known as a slidecast, is a type of podcast that combines audio with a slide show presentation. It is similar to a video podcast in that it combines dynamically generated imagery with audio synchronization, but it is different in that it uses presentation software to create the imagery and the sequence of display separately from the time of the original audio podcast recording. The Free Dictionary, YourDictionary, and PC Magazine define an enhanced podcast as "an electronic slide show delivered as a podcast". Enhanced podcasts are podcasts that incorporate graphics and chapters. iTunes developed an enhanced podcast feature called "Audio Hyperlinking" that they patented in 2012. Enhanced podcasts can be used by businesses or in education. Enhanced podcasts can be created using QuickTime AAC or Windows Media files. Enhanced podcasts were first used in 2006.

Fiction podcast
A fiction podcast (also referred to as a "scripted podcast" or "audio drama") is similar to a radio drama, but in podcast form. They deliver a fictional story, usually told over multiple episodes and seasons, using multiple voice actors, dialogue, sound effects, and music to enrich the story. Fiction podcasts have attracted a number of well-known actors as voice talents, including Demi Moore and Matthew McConaughey as well as from content producers like Netflix, Spotify, Marvel, and DC Comics. While science-fiction and horror are quite popular, fiction podcasts cover a full range of literary genres from romance, comedy, and drama to fantasy, sci-fi, and detective fiction. Examples of fiction podcasts include The Bright Sessions, The Magnus Archives, Homecoming, Wooden Overcoats , We're Alive and Wolverine: The Long Night.

Podcast novels
A podcast novel (also known as a "serialized audiobook" or "podcast audiobook") is a literary form that combines the concepts of a podcast and an audiobook. Like a traditional novel, a podcast novel is a work of literary fiction; however, it is recorded into episodes that are delivered online over a period of time. The episodes may be delivered automatically via RSS or through a website, blog, or other syndication method. Episodes can be released on a regular schedule, e.g., once a week, or irregularly as each episode is completed. In the same manner as audiobooks, some podcast novels are elaborately narrated with sound effects and separate voice actors for each character, similar to a radio play or scripted podcast, but many have a single narrator and few or no sound effects.

Some podcast novelists give away a free podcast version of their book as a form of promotion. On occasion such novelists have secured publishing contracts to have their novels printed. Podcast novelists have commented that podcasting their novels lets them build audiences even if they cannot get a publisher to buy their books. These audiences then make it easier to secure a printing deal with a publisher at a later date. These podcast novelists also claim the exposure that releasing a free podcast gains them makes up for the fact that they are giving away their work for free.

Video podcasts

A video podcast is a podcast that features supplemental video content. Web television series are often distributed as video podcasts. Dead End Days, a serialized dark comedy about zombies released from October 31, 2003, through 2004, is commonly believed to be the first video podcast.

Live podcasts 
A number of podcasts are recorded either in total or for specific episodes in front of a live audience. Ticket sales allow the podcasters an additional way of monetizing. Some podcasts create specific live shows to tour which are not necessarily included on the podcast feed. Events including the London Podcast Festival, SF Sketchfest and others regularly give a platform for podcasters to perform live to audiences.

Technology

Software
Podcast episodes are widely stored and encoded in the mp3 digital audio format and then hosted on dedicated or shared webserver space. Syndication of podcasts' episodes across various websites and platforms is based on RSS feeds, an XML-formatted file citing information about the episode and the podcast itself.

Hardware
The most basic equipment for a podcast is a computer and a microphone. It is helpful to have a sound-proof room and headphones. The computer should have a recording or streaming application installed. Typical microphones for podcasting are connected using USB. If the podcast involves two or more people, each person requires a microphone, and a USB audio interface is needed to mix them together. If the podcast includes video (livestreaming), then a separate webcam might be needed, and additional lighting.

See also
 List of podcast clients
 List of podcasting companies
 MP3 blog
 User-generated content
 Uses of podcasting
 Webcast

References

Further reading 
 Geoghegan, Michael W.; Klass, Dan (August 16, 2005). Podcast Solutions: The Complete Guide to Podcasting. Apress. .
 Meinzer, Kristen (August 6, 2019). So You Want to Start a Podcast: Finding Your Voice, Telling Your Story, and Building a Community That Will Listen. William Morrow. .
 Morris, Tee; Tomasi, Chuck (September 15, 2017). Podcasting For Dummies. Wiley. .

External links

Podcasting Legal Guide: Rules for the Revolution, information by Creative Commons

 
21st-century inventions
Articles containing video clips
British inventions
Digital audio
Media formats
Technology in society
Web syndication